Peppercombe is a small valley (combe) on the north-western coast of Devon, England. It is situated on the South West Coast Path between Westward Ho! to the north and Bucks Mills to the west. There is also a path descending from Horns Cross on the A39 road. The small stream of Peppercombe Water is a little over a kilometre long, but its valley is relatively deep. It ends in a waterfall consisting in a series of cascades, each between 0.5 and 1.5 metres high, that have formed due to the unequal hardness of the different beds of the underlying rock. The seaward section of Peppercombe is at the eastern end of the Hobby to Peppercombe biological Site of Special Scientific Interest (SSSI), while the coast section to north-east is part of the Mermaid's Pool to Rowden Gut geological SSSI. 


Geology 

A noticeable feature of the sea cliffs between Peppercombe and Portledge to the north is their distinctive red colour. Whereas the rocks of the surrounding areas form part of the Bude Formation of the Upper Carboniferous, those in the Peppercombe are an outlier of a later, presumably Permian age. These rocks extend for about 2km inland, and consist of breccias with scattered calcareous bands and nodules, with occasional beds of sand and sandstone. This outlier is thought to be a remnant of the New Red Sandstone that formerly covered a much larger part of Devon, having been eroded away in geological times. This has a much more extensive outcrop in south-eastern Devon. It is thought that these rocks are derived from sediment deposited by rainstorm floods in an otherwise dry desert area situated on the fringes of a rugged highland.

Peppercombe Castle 
Peppercombe Castle is an Iron Age Hill fort situated on the cliffs immediately to the west of the valley. The remains of the fort are hard to define from maps and it may well be that much of the site has been lost to coastal erosion, but it would seem to have been at around 80 m above sea level.

References

Bibliography

External links 
 Peppercombe at Devon Perspectives

Hill forts in Devon
Landforms of Devon
Geology of Devon